The Private Libraries Association (PLA) came into being in 1956 when 18-year-old Philip Ward wrote a letter to the Observer inviting booklovers and book collectors to attend a meeting to discuss the setting up of an association whose aims would be:-
To help readers in the organisation, cataloguing and fuller enjoyment of their personal collections;
To cover every subject field by voluntary organised specialisation, and to record locations for loans.
Although the membership has always included distinguished experts, it largely consists of ordinary collectors who share their enthusiasms and their knowledge. Since its foundation, the PLA has published a quarterly journal, originally called P.L.A. Quarterly but quickly renamed (from 1958) The Private Library; since Spring 1968, the journal has appeared in a standard format of some 40-50 pages containing two or three illustrated articles. It also publishes a members’ book every year or two years. The articles and books are written by members and cover a wide range of subjects – classic fine printing and modern private presses, modern small presses and children's books, illustrators and publishers, famous books and the history of printing, bookplates and bookbinding, bookselling, etc.. Details of the books and the Private Library can be found on the association’s website.

The current Chairman of the Association is James Freemantle.

References 

Book and manuscript collectors
Book arts
Book collecting
Organizations established in 1958